Ptychotis is a genus of flowering plants belonging to the family Apiaceae.

Its native range is Southwestern and Southern Central Europe.

Species:

Ptychotis sardoa 
Ptychotis saxifraga

References

Apiaceae
Apiaceae genera